Fatir (Originator), also known as Al-Mala’ikaha ("The Angels"), is the 35th chapter (sūrah) of the Qur'an with 46 verses (āyāt). Parts of Q35:39-49 are preserved in the Ṣan‘ā’1 lower text.

Regarding the timing and contextual background of the  believed revelation  (asbāb al-nuzūl), it is an earlier "Meccan surah", which means it is believed to have been revealed in Mecca, rather than later in Medina.

Summary

1-2 God praised as the Sovereign Creator
3 The Quraish exhorted to worship the true God
4 Muhammad told that it is no strange thing for a prophet to be called an impostor
5-6 God’s promises true, but Satan is a deceiver
7 Reward for believers and punishment for infidels sure
8-9 Reprobate sinners shall not be as the righteous before God
10 God exalteth the righteous but bringeth to nought the devices of sinners
11 The desert made green by rainfall a type of the resurrection
12 God, who is man’s Creator, knoweth all things
13 God’s mercy to man seen in the waters
14 Day, night, the sun, and moon glorify God
14-15 The vanity of idol-worship
16-18 Man is dependent on God, but God is self-sufficient
19 Every one shall bear his own burden in the judgment-day
19 Muhammad commanded to admonish secret believers
20-22 God will not regard the righteous and the unrighteous alike
22 Buried person can't be made listen anything 
23 Every nation has its own prophet
24-25 Those who accused the former prophets of imposture were punished
26-28 God’s mercy seen in nature
29-30 God rewards the prayerful and the charitable
31 The Qurán a confirmation of former Scriptures
32 The varied conduct of those who receive the Qurán
33-35 The rewards of the faithful in Paradise
36-37 The just punishment of disbelievers in hell
38 God knoweth the secrets of the heart
39 Disbelievers shall reap the fruit of their infidelity
40 God gave the idolaters no authority for their idolatry
41 God alone sustains the heavens
42  The Quraish impiously reject their Prophet
43  They shall receive the punishment bestowed upon those who rejected the former prophets
44 Arab polytheists were admonished to see the fate of previous nations before them.
45 Were God punish sinners, the world would be bereft of its human population but also God postpone their punishment until fixed time and when it's fixed time comes, God will regard his servants

Exegesis
Abu Hamza al-Thumal recorded from a parchment containing a speech on asceticism given by Imam Ali ibn Husayn Zayn al-Abidin in which the following verse from Surah Fatir was referenced: 
۝ 35:28: "Those truly fear Allah, among His Servants who have knowledge: for Allah is Exalted in Might, Oft-Forgiving."''' 
Concerning this verse, Zayn al-Abidin comments that the knowledge, by Allah, and the deeds are nothing but two harmonious matters. The one who recognizes Allah fears him, and the fear urges him to the deeds in obedience to Allah; the heads of knowledge follow him, recognize Allah, and strive to do good deeds.

References

External links
Q35:20, 50+ translations, islamawakened.com
Quran 35 Clear Quran translation

Fatir